Chris Owen (born ) is an American actor.  He is best known for his role as Chuck Sherman, a.k.a.The Sherminator in the American Pie film franchise, appearing in American Pie, American Pie 2, American Pie Presents: Band Camp and American Reunion.  Aside from Eugene Levy, he is the only actor from the theatrical features to appear in the "American Pie Presents:" direct-to-video spin-off movies.

Life and career
Owen began acting as early as age ten, with his first recorded film credit in Le peloton d'exécution (1991), a French-Canadian film. After that, he appeared in numerous films of the 1990s, like Major Payne, Black Sheep, Can't Hardly Wait, She's All That, October Sky, and the 1995 film Angus, the first of five films with longtime friend and collaborator Charlie Talbert.

In 1999, Owen appeared in the hit comedy film American Pie as Chuck Sherman, a teenager that boasts himself of being a "ladies man" and goes by "The Sherminator". Owen reprised his role in all of the sequels of the American Pie film franchise,  including one of the straight-to-DVD spin-offs called American Pie Presents: Band Camp.

Along with his appearances in the American Pie and National Lampoon film franchises, Owen has appeared in TV shows like 7th Heaven, Monk, and The Mentalist.

In 2014, a New York Daily News article reported Owen was working as a waiter at a sushi restaurant in Santa Monica, California. In the article, Owen says that "life doesn’t always go the way you planned. I love acting and this job lets me stay in the fight." Since that article was published, Owen has appeared in several films including a supporting role in The Last Sharknado: It's About Time as well as a guest spot on Criminal Minds.

During his career, Owen also appeared in the music videos of  Something Corporate's song "If You C Jordan" and Dimitri Vegas & Like Mike's song "Mammoth" with Moguai.

Filmography

References

External links
 

20th-century American male actors
21st-century American male actors
American male child actors
American male film actors
American male television actors
Male actors from California
Living people
Male actors from Michigan
Year of birth missing (living people)